Exiles Sports Club is a Maltese waterpolo team (it also has a swimming team), currently playing in the top tier Maltese Waterpolo Premier League. The club was founded in 1967 and hails from Sliema. The team is currently known as Exiles Elia Caterers for sponsorship reasons.

The Exiles Club is situated beneath one of the De Redin towers; this is portrayed on the club's crest.

The club is named after the Exiles beach, of which the name is unclear: either after a mispronunciation of a Customs and Excise Office that was once stationed on the bay, or after Russian exiles settled in the area after the Bolshevik Revolution. It is worth noting that before the club was built, a hut stood in the location, which acted as the seat of the Malta Eastern Club, which was an exclusive club for Cable & Wireless St. Julian's branch employees, taking the name from the Eastern Telegraph Company.

The club celebrated its 50-year anniversary in 2017.

The club operates a Beach Lido.

Current squad

Squad as at June 30, 2018:
 Simon Apap
 Andrea Bianchi
 Matthew Castillo
 Gianni Ciappara
 Aurélien Cousin
 Luca Felice
 Mark Fenech
 Kurt Griscti
 Benji Lanzon
 Slobodan Nikić
 Michael Paris
 Nicky Paris
 Philip Paris
 Michele Stellini
 Timmy Sullivan
 Sean Xerri de Caro
 Christian von Brockdorff

References

External links
 Official Website

Water polo clubs in Malta
Sliema
Sports clubs established in 1967
1967 establishments in Malta